Oleksii Ihorovych Shliakotin (born 2 September 1989) is a Ukrainian professional footballer who currently plays as a goalkeeper for Hong Kong Premier League club Sham Shui Po.

Club career 
Born in Kyiv, Ukraine, Aleks is a graduate of the Dynamo Kyiv football academy of Valeriy Lobanovskyi, where he was enrolled in 1997 (aged 8) by Oleksandr Lysenko, and played at its various levels. In 2005 he was called up to Ukraine national under-17 football team. In 2006, he signed his first professional contract with the second division team Dynamo-3 Kyiv.

In July 2010 (aged 20), Aleks moved to Poland, where he has played for the next 5 years. In January 2011 Shliakotin got an offer from the MŠK Žilina (champions of Slovakia), but transfer wasn't realized.

In January 2012 Aleks was brought to the attention of Leszek Ojrzynski, and subsequently signed for Korona Kielce, where he has worked with Maciej Szczesny.

In early July 2015, he signed a two-year deal with recently promoted C.F. União.

In 2016 Aleks moved to Hong Kong, and signed for Hong Kong Premier League club Biu Chun Glory Sky.

In May 2017, Aleks was nominated for "Goalkeeper of the Year", and "Player of The Year" in Hong Kong Premier League. Three of his saves were nominated for "Save of the Year" in Hong Kong Premier League.

On 2 August 2017, it was revealed that Rangers had signed Aleks.

On 22 October 2020, Rangers announced that Aleks would return to the club after two years away from the game.

On 4 October 2022, Aleks joined Sham Shui Po.

Personal life 
Aleks is married to Panamanian restaurateur Elizabeth Caballero.

References

External links
 
 

1989 births
Living people
Ukrainian footballers
Association football goalkeepers
Ukrainian expatriate footballers
Expatriate footballers in Poland
Ukrainian expatriate sportspeople in Poland
Expatriate footballers in Slovakia
Ukrainian expatriate sportspeople in Slovakia
Expatriate footballers in Portugal
Ukrainian expatriate sportspeople in Portugal
Expatriate footballers in Hong Kong
Ukrainian expatriate sportspeople in Hong Kong
II liga players
Ekstraklasa players
Primeira Liga players
Hong Kong Premier League players
FC Dynamo Kyiv players
FC Chornomorets Odesa players
Czarni Żagań players
Zagłębie Sosnowiec players
Korona Kielce players
C.F. União players
Hong Kong Rangers FC players
Sham Shui Po SA players
Footballers from Kyiv